McGarvie is the surname of:

 Blythe McGarvie, president and CEO of Leadership for International Finance, LLC
 John McGarvie (1795–1853), Scottish-born Australian Presbyterian minister and writer
 Richard McGarvie (1926–2003), judge in the Supreme Court of Victoria and Governor of Victoria 1992–1997
 William McGarvie (1810–1841), Scottish-born bookseller and newspaper owner, active in New South Wales

See also
 McGarvie Model, proposition for change to the Australian Constitution to remove references to the monarchy and establish a republic
 McGarvey, another surname